The Godiva Festival is a three-day music festival held each year in the War Memorial Park, Coventry, England, named after the city's famous former inhabitant Lady Godiva. It first appeared as a day-long event in 1997 and became a 3-day event the following year in 1998. It is the largest family music festival in the UK, and is made up of two fields; a Main Field and a Family field, which each offer a different experience.

Format
The modern three-day music festival is a non-profit making event organised by Coventry City Council.

The festival attracted 148,000 visits in 2016 to a  site in Coventry's War Memorial Park.

The festival includes a dedicated Main Stage which has played host to a wide array of mainstream and independent acts, including Kasabian, Biffy Clyro, The Charlatans, The Boomtown Rats, Scouting For Girls, The Wombats, Don Broco, Embrace, Fun Lovin' Criminals, the Buzzcocks, the Happy Mondays and The Enemy. The other large stage on the Main Field is the Rock/Rhythm Tent, which plays host to rock/metal acts on Friday night, and has seen artists such as Neck Deep, Slaves and Kids in Glass Houses perform since its introduction in 2014. Saturday's Rhythm Tent has seen acts such as Fuse ODG, JME, Big Narstie and D Double E.

Other features of the festival include the Family Field, an Acoustic Stage, a Paradise Tent, food stalls, a Hilltop bar, craft stalls, an Urban Youth Tent, a vintage market and a fairground.

The Family Field often sees attractions such as a petting farm, charity village, Community Stage, Lives and Times area, Greenspace area, Make Space tent, a funfair, cycle training, falconry and visits from local groups such as the Coventry Bears and the Fire Service.

Godiva Festival was a free, ticketless festival, that anyone can attend, until ticketing and charges were introduced in 2019. In 2019 the capacity of the festival was 40,000.

Line ups

2023 
The 2023 festival will take place from 30 June to 2 July. In February 2023, it was announced that The Enemy would headline on Friday 30 June. The Saturday headline was next to be announced as Rudimental. Mel C would be the headline for the Sunday and final day of the festival.

2022 
The 2022 festival took place from 2 to 4 September, to avoid a clash with BBC Radio 1's Big Weekend. The headline acts were announced in April 2022, The Libertines played the Friday slot, Tom Grennan on Saturday and Bananarama headlined on Sunday.

2021 
The 2021 festival took place from 3 to 5 September, but with a limited capacity because of the COVID-19 pandemic. The Saturday night headline was announced on 26 July 2021 as Craig David who would be performing his TS5 DJ Set. The headline act for the final day of the festival was announced as Sister Sledge, with Fun Lovin Criminals and David Rodigan also appearing. Another performer for the Saturday was announced on 5 August 2021, Sophie Ellis-Bextor.

2020 
The 2020 festival was announced as taking place from 3 to 5 July, but was cancelled in March 2020 as a result of the COVID-19 pandemic.

2019 
The 2019 festival took place from 5 to 7 July. The first act to be announced was Busted who headlined on the closing day of the festival. Subsequently, Brighton based folk-rock band Levellers have been confirmed as headlining on the opening night (Friday). as well as Frank Iero and the Future Violents in the Rock & Rhythm tent. The Saturday headline act was announced as Welsh rock band Feeder. Cornflakes at Kelly's, a local Coventry punk band also performed their festival debut, on the main stage on Saturday too.

2018 
The 2018 festival confirmed in February that it would take place from 31 August to 2 September. Ronan Keating was announced, in March 2018, as the Sunday headline act. A Saturday main stage act was announced at the end of April 2018 as Gabrielle. Other acts announced for the Saturday were Professor Green, Jonas Blue, Blood Red Shoes and Little Comets. The Friday night headliner was announced in June 2018 as Jake Bugg, at the same time Rae Morris and Kyle Falconer were announced as performers in the Rhythm Tent on the Saturday.
As the end of July 2018 Editors were announced as the Saturday headline act on the main stage.

2017 
Godiva Festival 2017 was confirmed in January 2017 for 7–9 July, and took place in the War Memorial Park. On 8 February 2017, The Darkness was announced as the Sunday headline act. On 20 February 2017, The Stranglers were confirmed as the Friday night headline act.

2016
Coventry Godiva Festival 2016 was confirmed in January 2016, and took place on 1–3 July in the War Memorial Park. The Friday night headline was  the Boomtown Rats supported by Space. The Saturday headline was The Charlatans supported by Mystery Jets. The Sunday headline was Scouting for Girls, who were supported by The Pigeon Detectives.

The weekend saw Godiva Festival visited over 148,000 times and was the most successful festival to date.

2015
The 2015 Godiva Festival took place from 3 to 5 July. The headline act for Friday was Fun Lovin' Criminals, Saturday The Wombats and Sunday Embrace.

2014
The 2014 Godiva Festival took place from 4 to 6 July. The headline act was the Happy Mondays.

2013
The 2013 Godiva Festival took place from 5 to 7 July 2013. Friday was headlined by Echo & the Bunnymen who were to headline in the 2012 cancelled event. Saturday was headlined by Maxïmo Park and Sunday starred the Loveable Rogues and Amelia Lily. The festival claimed to have broken attendance records with over 125,000 visits being estimated over the three days.

2012
The 2012 festival was scheduled to take place Friday 30 June to Sunday 1 July, but bad weather forced the event to be cancelled.

Friday was scheduled to be headlined by Echo & the Bunnymen with Space in support.  Saturday was scheduled with Cast as headliners, with support from The View and The Pigeon Detectives. Sunday evening was scheduled to link in with the arrival of the Olympic Torch Relay and the lighting of the Olympic Beacon in the park.

The festival was cancelled by Coventry City Council on 29 June 2012, owing to the recent 'bad weather conditions causing unstable ground'. The Olympic Torch procession continued unaffected.

2011
The 2011 Godiva Festival took place from Friday 1 July to Sunday 3 July. The headline acts were Heaven 17 and Athlete, attended by a record breaking crowd of 120,000 people.

2010
The 2010 Godiva Festival took place from Friday 2 July to Sunday 4 July.

2009

The 2009 Godiva Festival took place from Friday 3 July to Sunday 5 July, headlined by Scottish alternative band Idlewild.

2008
The 2008 Godiva Festival took place from Friday 4 July to Sunday 6 July, headlined by the Coventry band The Enemy.

2007

The 2007 Godiva Festival took place from Friday 13 July to Sunday 15 July with headliners Super Furry Animals. It was also the 10th year for the festival.

2006
The 2006 festival took take place from Friday 14 July to Sunday 16 July with headliners Mercury Rev.

2005
The 2005 festival took place Friday 8 July to Sunday 10 July.

It was the first time the comedy stage appeared and featured Shappi Khorsandi. Also on the Friday night Nerina Pallot performed and John Burnside recited poetry.

On Saturday the main stage lineup was:
Hundred Reasons
The Others
Little Barrie
The Paddingtons
Kid Carpet
Dogs

Whilst EcoRhythm consisted of:
Blak Twang
Skinnyman
Yungun
Mr Thing

2004
The 2004 festival took place Friday 11 June to Sunday 13 June

The Saturday night main stage line up was:
The Datsuns
Goldie Lookin Chain
Young Heart Attack
Kasabian

2003
The 2003 festival took place Friday 6 June to Sunday 8 June.

The Saturday night main stage lineup included:
Shed Seven
Har Mar Superstar
The Eighties Matchbox B-Line Disaster

2002
The 2002 festival took place Friday 7 June to Sunday 9 June. It was the fifth year the festival had taken place.

Bands who played include:
Biffy Clyro
Six by Seven
Budapest

1998
The second Godiva Festival was held on Friday 5 - Sunday 7 June 1998. 
Main stage headline acts on the two weekend days were Banco de Gaia and Silinder Pardesi respectively.

References

External links

 Godiva Festival (official site)
 Godiva Festival on eFestivals
 Coventry City Council

Music in Coventry
Music festivals in the West Midlands (county)
Music festivals established in 2002